Liem Seeng Tee (1893 – 1956) was the founder of PT HM Sampoerna Tbk., one of the largest tobacco companies in Indonesia. In the 1930s, Liem Seeng Tee adopted the Indonesian name Sampoerna (cf. sempurna) meaning "perfection" as his family name, thus becoming the company's namesake. Sampoerna produces Dji Sam Soe in 1913, Sampoerna A Hijau in 1968, and Sampoerna A Mild in 1988.

Personal life 
Liem is the first generation of Sampoerna's family.
Liem's wife is Liem Tjiang Nio.
Liem's children are Liem Swie Hwa, Liem Swie Ling (Aga Sampoerna), Liem Sin No, Liem Hwee Nio, and Liem Kwang Nio. Liem's grandchild is Putera Sampoerna.

References 

1893 births
1956 deaths
Chinese emigrants to Indonesia
Businesspeople from Fujian
Indonesian people of Chinese descent
Sampoerna family
Emigrants from China to the Dutch East Indies